An election to Dublin Corporation took place in March 1911 as part of that year's Irish local elections. The election saw a decline for Sinn Féin, with the Unionists regaining their position as the councils second party.

Council composition following election

Ward results

Clontarf West

Councillor

Drumcondra

Councillor

Fitzwilliam

Councillor

Glasnevin

Councillor

New Kilmainham

Alderman

Inns Quay

Councillor

Mansion House

Councillor

North Dock

Councillor

Royal Exchange

Councillor

South City

Alderman

Councillor

References

1911 Irish local elections
1911